Mark Andrew Harris (born 15 July 1963) is an English former professional footballer who played as a defender.

Career
He began his career with Wokingham Town before signing for Crystal Palace in June 1988. He had a brief loan spell at Burnley and made only two appearances for Palace, both as a substitute, in their 1988–89 promotion season. In 1989, he moved on to Swansea City, for whom he made 228 appearances, scoring 14 goals between then and 1995. Whilst at Swansea he was part of the team that won the 1994 Football League Trophy Final after a penalty shootout. He later played for Gillingham and Cardiff City and made over 300 total appearances in the English Football League. He later played in non-league football for Kingstonian, Henley Town and Bromley.

References

External links 
Mark Harris, Post War English & Scottish Football League A - Z Player's Transfer Database

1963 births
Living people
Sportspeople from Reading, Berkshire
English footballers
Association football defenders
Wokingham Town F.C. players
Crystal Palace F.C. players
Burnley F.C. players
Swansea City A.F.C. players
Gillingham F.C. players
Cardiff City F.C. players
Kingstonian F.C. players
Henley Town F.C. players
Bromley F.C. players
English Football League players
National League (English football) players